Sree Kurumba Bhagavati Temple  (alternatively Kodungallur Devi Temple) is a Hindu temple at Kodungallur, Thrissur District, Kerala state, India. It is dedicated to the goddess Bhadrakali, a form of Mahakali or simply Durga or Aadi Parashakthi worshipped and significantly revered in Kerala. The goddess is known also by the names "Sri Kurumba"" (The Mother of Kodungallur). This temple is the head of 64 Bhadrakali temples in Kerala especially Malabar. This Mahakali temple is one of the oldest functioning temples in India. This is attested by numerous Tamil poems and inscriptions of different times. The goddess of the temple represents the goddess in her fierce ('ugra') form, facing North, featuring eight hands with various attributes. One is holding the head of the demon king Daruka, another a sickle-shaped sword, next an anklet, another a bell, among others. Routine worship at the temple every day at 03:00 and ends at 21:00 local time.

The temple is often accredited as the original form of Goddess Kali. 
During the reign of Later Cheras, Mahodayapuram (Kodungallur) was the capital of the Chera empire and one of the most important parts of the region. The temple is located in Thrissur district,Central Kerala. The Temple was built in a remote past and its worship incorporates ancient Shaktyeism customs which are rarely observed in contemporary Kerala temples. 

The priests of Kodungallur temple convey the story that this temple was, in the olden days, a Shiva shrine and it was Parasurama who installed the murti of Bhadrakali close to one of Shiva.  The pujas are conducted, it is said, under direct instructions from the goddess herself. Five 'Sri Chakras', said to have been installed by Adi Shankaracharya, are believed to be the main source of the powers of this deity. The priests are Namboodiris ( Tanthri) and Adikals (Who have a right to perform 'Pushpanjalis' to the Goddess.

The Kodungallur temple priests are  Adikals(from 4 families). It is said that there are 12 types of Namboodiris of which one is called Adikal, however are classified as nair by the government. This is a typical example of Sanskritisation as described by sociologist M. N. Srinivas. It is reported that they hail from the tradition of Mezhathur Agnihotri. The pooja tradition received by them is very rare and has its innate secrecy and is being traditionally received from ancestors. Adikal means poojaneeyar and are very renowned in Sreechakra Pooja and Sreevidhyopasana. The ancestors had great spiritual power and their roots are said to be at Kodikkunnu near Thrithala/Pallipuram of Palakkad District.

It is in this temple, Kannaki Amman, the heroine of Ilango Adigal's Tamil story Silappathikaram attained salvation. She came to Kodungallur, prayed to Bhadrakali of Kodungallur and became absorbed in the murti.

It is said that the temple was constructed by Cheraman Perumal. The first Shakteya Pooja in kodungallur temple was performed by a Thiyyar from Malabar. Even present day , The Thiyya thandans (An administrative position) of 64 tharas meet at Nilapaduthara at Kodungaloor in the presence of kodungallur raja.  It was the only day where untouchables were allowed to enter the temple till Temple entry proclamation was announced in Cochin state in 1948.

In Tantric terms, the divinity is installed in what is called the "Rurujit Vidhaana" pattern, a form of installation with Shiva in one end, Ganesha in the other, with the Sapta Matrika goddesses in between. 

In ancient times, animal sacrifices were offered at the temple, mostly in the forms of birds and goats, by devotees seeking protection and the fulfillment of their prayers. At the intervention of many "social reformers," the government of Cochin banned animal sacrifice in any form at this place. At present, only red-dyed dhotis are offered to the deity. Many devotees offer rich presents and gold ornaments.

Temple structure

The temple is situated in the middle of a plot of land about ten acres, surrounded by banyan and peepal trees. The srikovil is facing north. The western chamber of the inner temple is the seat of Sapthamatrukas (Seven Mothers) such as Brahmi, Vaishnavi, Maheshwari, Indrani, Varahi, Kaumari and Chamunda (Kali) who also faces the north. The idols of Ganapathi and Veerabhadra are found in the chamber, one facing east and the other facing west, respectively. The idol of bhagawati is about seven feet high and made of wood, carved from a jackfruit tree. The idol has eight arms that carry weapons and symbols.

To the left of the temple sits a small stone structure called 'the Samadhi of Vysoori', perhaps a medieval shrine for a deity of smallpox, chicken pox, mumps and other contagious diseases. Devotees make offerings of turmeric powder, sprinkled and rubbed on its walls. About fifty metres further is a sacred pond called (Pushkarini), where devotees bathe before entering the main shrine. It is believed that this pond was created by the goddess by striking the ground with her sword.

Festivals

Bharani festival

The Bharani festival at the Kodungallur Bhagawati temple is one of the major festivals of Kerala. It is a month of festivities from the Bharani asterism in the month of Kumbham to 7 days after the Bharani asterism in the month of Meenam. It normally falls between the months of March and April. The festival usually starts with a ritual called 'Kozhikkallu moodal' which involves giving cocks over red clothes. In olden days this involve sacrifice of cocks and shedding of their blood, which forms an important feature of this temple. The members of the "Kodungallur Bhagavathy Veedu" are allowed to participate in this ritual. It is to appease the goddess Kali and her demons.

'Kavu Theendal' sometimes called as 'Kavu Pookal' is another major part of the festival. Bhadrakali being the patron of the royal family of Cranganore, the raja of Kodungallur plays an active part in the celebrations. Standing upon a platform built around a banyan tree, the Raja spreads out a silken parasol soon after the door of the Devi shrine is opened. This gesture represents a permission given for all castes to enter the precincts of the temple for worship. Devotees run round the temple three times with sticks in their hands, before entering the shrine. The ritual commemorates the slaying of the demon Daruka, and the sticks are said to be substitutes for the swords and other weapons used for the ritual in the past. 

During this ritual, Vellichapads, (oracles of the goddess), dressed as the goddess and said to be possessed by her, run around the temple in a frenzied trance state, waving their sickle-shaped swords in the air while the members of their retinue offer reverence over the inner quadrangle of the temple. They yell out lewd, bawdy, abusive cries at the goddess, which is said to please her. This is followed by a purification ceremony the next day.

'Chandanapoti Charthal or Thrichandanacharthu pooja' is another festival, involving smearing the image with sandalwood paste.

Thalappoli festival
The Thalappoli festival is in the month of Makaram (January–February). The four-day Thalappoli commences from the evening of Makara Sankranthi with religious rituals. Big procession headed by richly caparisoned elephants are taken out to the accompaniment of Pancha Vadyam, Paancari, Paandi, etc. It is celebrated by all sections of people of Kodungalloor and adjacent areas.  The first day of Thalappoli consists of many offerings to goddess. "souseeni" as it is called among the kudumbi community is one among them.  This is basically mixing riceflakes with jaggery and coconut, later on this is shared among the devotees around.

Administration
This temple is managed by the Cochin Devaswom Board along with the Raja of Cranganore, the Kshetra Upadesaka samiti.Onnu Kure Áyiram Yogam (an association of Nair community) conducts the first day of Thalappoli.. . The Bhagavathi temple is one of the richest temples in Kerala.

See also

 Kannaki Amman
 Mookambika Temple
 Kaula (Hinduism)
 Tantrik
 Shaktism
 Onnu Kure Áyiram Yogam
 Muziris
 108 Shiva Temples
 Temples of Kerala
 Vellayani Devi Temple 
 Parumala Valiya Panayannarkavu Devi Temple
 Thirumandhamkunnu Devi Temple

References

External links

Hindu temples in Thrissur district
Bhagavathi temples in Kerala
108 Shiva Temples